Getaway is the fourth studio album by New Zealand group The Clean, released in 2001. The songs "Alpine Madness" and "Circle Canyon" feature contributions from Yo La Tengo members Georgia Hubley and Ira Kaplan.

Track listing

References

External links

2001 albums
The Clean albums
Matador Records albums